The following is a list of starships, cruisers, battleships, and other spacecraft in the Star Wars films, books, and video games.

Spacecraft appearing in the original trilogy

Death Star

The Death Star is the Empire's battle station which has ability to use a kyber-crystal powered laser to destroy entire planets. It appears throughout the Star Wars franchise, particularly the original trilogy.

Executor (Super Star Destroyer)

The Executor serves as Darth Vader's flagship during the events of The Empire Strikes Back, leading the Death Squadron against the Rebel Alliance on Hoth and in pursuit of the Millennium Falcon.  It features again in Return of the Jedi where, during the final space battle, it is destroyed after a Rebel A Wing crashes into the command bridge, causing the Executor to lose control and be destroyed as the second Death Star's gravity pulls the flagship into its surface.

For The Empire Strikes Back, George Lucas wanted the Executor to be so massive it made the previous Star Destroyers appear tiny.  A six-foot model of the Executor was constructed which had over 150,000 individual lights in it.  According to chief model maker Lorne Peterson, the ship was originally scaled to appear sixteen miles long, though later sources would amend this figure.

According to in-universe Star Wars sources, the Executor was the lead ship of a new class of Star Dreadnoughts; the term "Super Star Destroyer" is a colloquialism applied to any ship larger than a standard Imperial Star Destroyer. It similarly carries more than a thousand ships including TIE Fighters.

Home One (Mon Calamari cruiser)
Home One made its theatrical appearance in Return of the Jedi as Admiral Ackbar's flagship during the Battle of Endor. According to the old Expanded Universe (now Star Wars Legends) material, the Galactic Empire occupied the planet of Mon Calamari (also known as Mon Cala or Dac). After the Empire destroyed three floating cities to pacify the planet, the peaceful Mon Calamari converted their passenger liners and deep space exploration cruisers into warships, driving the Imperials from their homeworld prior to the Battle of Yavin. Darth Vader successfully subjugates Mon Cala, leading to a mass exodus of city-ships from Mon Cala. This fleet would later be commanded by Admiral Raddus and Admiral Ackbar and join the Rebel Alliance.

Each Mon Calamari vessel was individually unique due to the artistry of their Mon Calamari builders, even those of the same "class". According to Star Wars: The Roleplaying Game sourcebooks, while smaller and carrying less weaponry than Imperial-class Star Destroyers, the Mon Calamari cruisers are often more than a match in head-to-head engagements. This is attributed to the Mon Calamari cruisers' multiple backup shields and multiple shield generators as well as more balanced all-around firing arcs. The franchise's books, comics, and video games from Legends describe and depict other Mon Calamari cruisers and successor designs, such as the MC80B Mon Remonda in the Star Wars: X-wing novels, the MC90 star cruiser Galactic Voyager, the Mediator-class battle cruisers, and Viscount-class Star Defenders (which were meant to be the answer to the Executor-class Super Star Destroyers) in R.A. Salvatore's Vector Prime.

Industrial Light and Magic (ILM) created two Mon Calamari cruiser designs: the cylindrical "flying cigar" Home One command ship and a "winged" model identified in the Expanded Universe as the Liberty. The "winged" model would have its wings removed and thrusters modified to portray another subtype. The ships were designed to be as aesthetically different from the Imperial Star Destroyers as possible, although the filming crew disliked the "pickle ships" due to the models' unflattering angles. Internal neon lights provided lighting, and detail was painted on by using the second Death Star model's exposed framework as a makeshift frisket. The model's design, as well as that of other Mon Calamari cruisers to appear in the film, was a collaborative effort between George Lucas, Nilo Rodis-Jamero, and Joe Johnston.

In Return of the Jedi, Admiral Ackbar (Timothy M. Rose) leads the Rebels during the Battle of Endor from the flagship, Alliance Headquarters Frigate Home One, a modified MC80A star cruiser; although that ship survives the Battle of Endor, the Death Star's superlaser destroys other Mon Calamari cruisers, including the Liberty. In Revenge of the Sith, the Confederacy of Independent Systems (Separatists) used the Providence-class carrier/destroyer as their frontline capital ship at the Battle of Coruscant. A modified variant, the Invisible Hand, serves as the command ship for Count Dooku and General Grievous. In Rogue One, Admiral Raddus flew his flag on the MC75 Star Cruiser Profundity at the Battle of Scarif. The design of Profundity was meant to be a cross between the MC80 star cruiser from Return of the Jedi and the Separatists' Providence-class carrier/destroyer in Revenge of the Sith. In The Last Jedi, the Raddus, formerly known as the Dawn of Tranquility, was an MC85 Star Cruiser that served as the flagship of General Leia Organa. It was used by the Resistance during its war against the First Order. It was one of the last purpose-built warships before the signing of the Military Disarmament Act by the Galactic Empire and New Republic. The vessel gained the moniker Raddus upon its entry into the service of the Resistance, when Admiral Gial Ackbar petitioned to rename it in honor of the famed Admiral Raddus, who had died in service of the Alliance at the Battle of Scarif after defying the Rebel Alliance's political leaders and choosing to fight against seemingly insurmountable odds.

A 1994 Micro Machines three-pack included a winged Mon Calamari cruiser toy, and a 1996 three-pack included the other variety. Hasbro in 2003 planned to release a Mon Calamari cruiser as part of its Action Fleet collection but they cancelled the line before producing it. Decipher and Wizards of the Coast published Mon Calamari cruiser cards for the Star Wars Customizable Card Game and Star Wars Trading Card Game, respectively. In 2006, Wizards of the Coast created a Mon Calamari Star Defender miniature as part of its Star Wars Miniatures Starship Battles game. Mon Calamari cruisers are player-controllable units in LucasArts' Empire at War real-time strategy. Fantasy Flight Games's Star Wars: Armada, a table top miniatures game released on March 27, 2015, adds several Mon Calamari cruisers to the Rebel side in the expansions, including the MC80 Home One, MC80 Liberty, MC75 Profundity, and MC30c Frigate.

Imperial landing craft (Sentinel-class landing craft)
Imperial landing craft (or Sentinel-class landing craft) were designed for the Special Edition release of Star Wars Episode IV: A New Hope and created entirely with CGI. However, they first appeared in products of the Star Wars: Shadows of the Empire multimedia campaign. According to in-universe sources, the primary mission for Sentinel-class craft is deploying Imperial military forces from orbit onto a planet, though it can be used for other missions including short-range scouting, cargo transport and close air support.  Heavily armored and equipped with powerful deflector shields, Imperial landers carry eight laser cannons, two concussion missile launchers, two blaster cannons and an ion cannon turret.  As a troop transport it can carry 54 stormtroopers into battle, or carry vehicles via cargo pod installed on its underside.

Imperial shuttle (Lambda-class shuttle)
Lambda-class T4a shuttles first appeared in Star Wars: Episode VI - Return of the Jedi, and were later added to the Special Edition release of The Empire Strikes Back. Joe Johnston, Ralph McQuarrie, and Nilo Rodis-Jamero borrowed elements from the skyhopper designed for A New Hope when refining the shuttle's appearance. Earlier versions were boxy, boat-like, or had TIE fighter-like components. Industrial Light and Magic's modelmakers made two shooting models, although CGI versions were used for the craft's Special Edition appearance in The Empire Strikes Back. The Theta-class shuttle in Revenge of the Sith was designed to appear like a predecessor to the Lambda class. A Lambda-class shuttle makes a cameo appearance during the docking sequence of Inara Serra's shuttle in "Serenity", the pilot episode of Joss Whedon's Firefly.

According to reference material, Lambda-class shuttles are one of the most common vessels in the Imperial navy and can be configured for a number of roles, including cargo transport, troop carrier, or diplomatic courier. It is a popular personal transport for high-ranking Imperial officials as its armament, reinforced hull and deflector shielding allow it to travel safely even without an escort. It was also rumored by Imperial officials that the Emperor himself used a highly modified Lambda-class shuttle, which was allegedly equipped with a cloaking device. The shuttle is propelled by two ion engines while a hyperdrive allows for long-distance journeys. A crew of two to six pilot the shuttle in a forward cockpit, which in an emergency can jettison from the main body of the vehicle; not all 20 passengers can fit in the cockpit however, so the most senior personnel are given priority to escape. For armament the Lambda-class shuttle is equipped with two Taim & Bak KX5 double blaster cannons on the folding wings, two forward-mounted Taim & Bak GA-60s double laser cannons, and a rear-mounted ArMek R-Z0 retractable double blaster cannon.

Imperial Star Destroyer

The Star Destroyers are the Galactic Empire's assault ships. Much like the Republic assault ships, the two have similar hulls, bridges, engines, and many other parts. They appear in a variety of forms throughout the Star Wars franchise. The Ravager, an Executor-class Star Dreadnought, was destroyed during the Battle of Jakku.

Millennium Falcon (YT-1300 light freighter)

The Millennium Falcon is a highly modified YT-1300F light freighter captained by smuggler Han Solo (Harrison Ford) and his Wookiee first mate, Chewbacca (Peter Mayhew).

The YT-1300 Corellian light freighter, manufactured by the Corellian Engineering Corporation, was essentially a giant "forklift" designed to tug around giant container ships. As one of the most successful designs in history, the appeal of the vessel is not its basic equipment, but its modular ability to take an extraordinary amount of modifications and alterations. But the downside is the cockpit being placed on the right side makes it extremely hard to pilot correctly. Its popularity among freighter captains throughout the galaxy guaranteed commercial operation in the galaxy during the final days of the Galactic Republic and the reign of the Galactic Empire.

Rebel Medical Frigate (Nebulon-B frigate)
Luke Skywalker (Mark Hamill) receives a prosthetic hand aboard the Redemption, a modified Nebulon-B escort frigate, at the conclusion of Star Wars: Episode V - The Empire Strikes Back. A Nebulon-B medical frigate is part of the Rebel Alliance fleet at the Battle of Endor in Return of the Jedi. Expanded Universe material states that relatively affordable Nebulon-B frigates, which are effective at engaging starfighters, are used by both the Rebellion and the Galactic Empire. The frigates appear in several LucasArts titles, including the X-Wing flight simulators series, Empire at War real-time strategy game, and Star Wars: Battlefront, as well as episodes 'Zero Hour' and 'Secret Cargo' of Star Wars Rebels.

Industrial Light & Magic's Nilo Rodis-Jamero and Joe Johnston created the frigate late during work on The Empire Strikes Back, with the design following a suggestion by George Lucas that it be based on an outboard motor. The model was produced in a short time with limited financial access; it was primarily built from components left over from previous kitbashing exercises, including battleship hulls and artillery pieces.

Following the completion of filming, Lucas decided to revisit the end of the movie to better establish the characters' final locations, requiring a section of the frigate to be built that corresponded to the scale of the  Millennium Falcon model. The model was originally referred to as the Rebel starcruiser or Rebel cruiser, but during filming of Return of the Jedi, it was renamed Rebel Medical Frigate after the cruiser name was used for the Mon Calamari cruisers.

According to in-universe sources, the EF76 Nebulon-B escort frigate is a versatile design which can be modified to fulfill a variety of different roles, from long-range scouting to search-and-rescue missions.  When fully armed, the -long frigate is equipped with twelve turbolasers, twelve laser cannons, and a pair of tractor beam projectors, and can carry a full squadron of starfighters.  The design is most famous for serving as medical frigates, with full-service hospital facilities and a capacity for 700 patients.

Rebel Transport (GR-75 medium transport)
GR-75 medium transports are a class of ship which first appears in The Empire Strikes Back during the evacuation of Echo Base on Hoth, and have made appearances in other media. These are held in place by a magnetic shield and allows the transport to accommodate  of cargo. Cheap and easy to maintain, these transports are only equipped with four twin laser cannons and minimal deflector shields, though some are retrofitted for combat.

Slave I (Firespray-31) 
Slave I is the starship used by bounty hunter Boba Fett (Jeremy Bulloch) in The Empire Strikes Back and The Mandalorian (in which Boba is played by Temuera Morrison), and by his father Jango Fett (also played by Morrison) in Attack of the Clones. The ship's design is said to resemble the shape of a street lamp. However, the actual inspiration for the shape of the ship was a radar dish, according to Nilo Rodis-Jamero, the assistant art director and visual effects creator on The Empire Strikes Back. Rodis-Jamero created the initial design after seeing Joe Johnston's ideas for Boba Fett, and states that "the original design I had was round, but when you looked at it from the side, it became elliptical...George [Lucas] thought it was elliptical, so that's what it became." He goes on to say that "[w]hen building the ship at ILM, someone looked at the street lamps and pointed out that they looked like Boba's ship. So everyone began to think that was where I got the idea for the design." Its appearance in the original release of The Empire Strikes Back was realized by a combination of matte paintings and a  model.

According to in-universe reference material, Slave I is a modified Firespray-31-class patrol craft produced by Kuat Systems Engineering. Unique in design, the Firespray-31-class has a distinct engine cluster on which the ship rests when landed, but when in flight the ship rotates 90 degrees so that the top-mounted cockpit faces forward.  The ship's artificial gravity similarly reorients depending on the flight mode, while the rotating stabilizer fins on either side carry repulsorlifts to assist with landing. The class only saw limited production, as it was considered too heavily armed for civilian use, too underpowered for Kuat's home fleet, and too reliable for post-sale maintenance business. Jango Fett chose the vessel for, among other reasons, its anonymous appearance, but heavily modified it with additional weaponry, expanded crew quarters and more secure (and less humane) prisoner cabinets.

After inheriting Slave I from his father, Boba Fett made additional modifications to the vessel. These include a secret (and stolen) military sensor-jamming and masking device that enables the ship to disappear from most sensor systems, immobilizing bunks for up to six prisoners, and even more weaponry. Armaments include 2 Borstel GN-40 twin rotating blaster cannons, 2 Dymek HM-8 concussion missile launchers, a Brugiss C/In ion cannon, a Phylon F1 tractor beam projector, and 2 Arakyd AA/SL proton torpedo launchers.

Tantive IV (Rebel Blockade Runner)

The Tantive IV, identified in source material as a CR90 Corellian corvette, first appears in the opening scene of the original Star Wars: Episode IV - A New Hope, commanded by Princess Leia (Carrie Fisher) as she evades pursuit from Darth Vader (David Prowse/James Earl Jones) aboard his Imperial Star Destroyer.  Her adoptive father Bail Organa (Jimmy Smits) is seen using a similar vessel during the prequel movie Revenge of the Sith, identified in source material as the CR70 model Tantive III.  Corellian corvettes, also known as Rebel Blockade Runners for their powerful engine array and ability to outrun customs vessels, are manufactured by the Corellian Engineering Corporation.

Spacecraft appearing in the prequel trilogy

Banking Clan Frigate (Munificent-class Star Frigate)
Also known as Separatist Frigates, these vessels made their theatrical appearance in Star Wars: Episode III - Revenge of the Sith and feature in Clone Wars-related media. The design of these and other Separatist vessels was done specifically to reverse the visual iconography of the original Star Wars trilogy by having "good guy" ships be triangular and "bad guy" ships be smoother and more organic. Unused Joe Johnston designs of Rebel ships from Return of the Jedi were used as inspiration by Revenge of the Sith concept artists in creating the Banking Clan frigate and other vessels.

According to in-universe material, these Munificent-class Star Frigates were built by Hoersch-Kessel Drive Inc. on behalf of the InterGalactic Banking Clan for the Separatist cause.  Forming the bulk of the Separatist fleet during the war, these frigates filled the dual role of combat and communications ships, using powerful antennas to coordinate fleet actions utilizing faster-than-light hyperwaves to communicate anywhere within the galaxy or jam enemy sensors and communications.

However they require only a small crew of 200 battle droids to operate, with a storage capacity of up to 150,000 additional battle droids for boarding actions or ground assaults. In battle, these frigates' armaments make them grossly overpowered for their size. Each is armed with two forward-facing heavy turbolaser cannons which at full power can blast-melt an ice-moon  in diameter; two long-range ion cannons; 26 twin turbolaser cannons; 20 light turbolaser turrets; and 38 point-defense laser cannons.

Commerce Guild Support Destroyer (Recusant-class Light Destroyer)
These spacecraft made their theatrical appearance in Revenge of the Sith in addition to other Clone Wars-related media as a capital ship used by Separatist forces. As with other Separatist spacecraft, the design of these destroyers was based on unused concept art for Rebel capital ships from Return of the Jedi.

Officially referred to as Recusant-class light destroyers in background material, their in-universe origin comes from Mon Calamari plans that were stolen by Quarren Separatists and jointly manufactured by the Commerce Guild and Techno Union. Because they are primarily controlled via droid brain, they require a crew of only 300 battle droids to operate, with storage space for an additional 40,000 battle droids. Their diverse armament includes a prow heavy turbolaser cannon, 4 heavy turbolaser cannons, 6 heavy turbolaser turrets, 5 turbolaser cannons, 30 dual laser cannons, 12 dual light laser cannons, and 60 point-defense light laser cannons. However their effectiveness in battle comes from overwhelming numbers, as between four to six Recusant-class ships are needed to outgun a Venator Star Destroyer. Their only true weakness is the single-minded nature of their droid brain, although the lack of self-preservation means they are not above deliberately ramming their target in order to destroy it.

Dooku's solar sailer
Darth Tyranus, also known as Count Dooku (Christopher Lee), reaches Coruscant near the end of Star Wars: Episode II – Attack of the Clones aboard a Punworcca 116-class interstellar sloop, better known as a "solar sailer", built by the  Huppla Pasa Tisc Shipwright Collective. The ship, which also appears multiple times in Star Wars: The Clone Wars, is equipped with a solar sail which was originally part of the concept for the Naboo royal starship in Star Wars: Episode I – The Phantom Menace. However the model was redesigned to reflect the harsher environment of Geonosis and the insectoid Geonosians, resembling both a beetle and a butterfly.  Originally it was to have separate pilot and passenger compartments, but during production this was altered and a forward cockpit bubble was added when it was determined there was a need for a shot of Dooku sitting next to his pilot. It is somewhat similar to the private Antonov An-2 plane in real life.  During filming of Attack of the Clones, a full-size model of the sailer was built in order to stage the lightsaber duel between Count Dooku and Yoda (Frank Oz).

According to Star Wars canon sources, the solar sailer is a luxurious yacht commissioned by Dooku from his allies on Geonosis prior to the outbreak of the Clone Wars. To defend it from attack, the vessel is equipped with eighty-four tractor/repulsor beam projectors.

Invisible Hand (Providence-class carrier/destroyer)
General Grievous's flagship in Revenge of the Sith is the Invisible Hand, appearing in the film's opening space battle above the planet Coruscant.  With Supreme Chancellor Palpatine (Ian McDiarmid) held prisoner aboard the ship, Jedi Knights Obi-Wan Kenobi (Ewan McGregor) and Anakin Skywalker (Hayden Christensen) launch a rescue mission to save him, boarding the ship where they confront and ultimately defeat Count Dooku (Christopher Lee).  With the Invisible Hand crippled in the battle, General Grievous flees aboard an escape pod as Anakin and Obi Wan successfully guide half the ship to an emergency landing on  Coruscant.

George Lucas had a personal hand in the design of the ship, including the addition of the raised spire in which Obi-Wan, Anakin and Count Dooku have their duel.  The raised spire also helped differentiate the command ship from the other capital ships over Coruscant.  While the ship was completely CGI, unlike similarly modeled ships for the film it needed a complex interior that was fully mapped out for the various set pieces which take place during the movie.  Once the floor plans were approved, they were constructed as both CG and actual rooms, with multiple large-scale sets for the actors to perform in.  More sets of rooms aboard the ship were built than seen in the final film; several "serial-type escapades" were cut from the final release. Other sets, built inside a mount that could rotate them, were used to depict the vessel's collapse.

The Invisible Hand is described according to in-universe references as a Providence-class carrier/destroyer, a classification representing the dreadnought's dual roles in planetary domination. Given its size the Invisible Hand can store up to 1.5 million battle droids but only requires a crew of 600 to operate. The Invisible Hand can unleash tremendous damage with 14 quad turbolaser cannons, each of which at maximum output is equivalent to a magnitude-10 earthquake; 2 heavy ion cannons; 34 dual laser cannons; 12 point-defense ion cannons, and 102 proton torpedo launchers. Its hangars have been extensively modified from other Providence-class vessels, allowing the battleship to carry 120 fighters (a mixture of Vulture droids and Tri-fighters), 160 MTTs and 280 other ground vehicles including AATs, Hailfire droids and Homing spider droids. Providence-class ships are equipped with a main upper sensor tower and a secondary ventral sensor pod, but on the Invisible Hand the main communication/sensor pod is refitted into a lofty sanctum for Count Dooku from which he broadcasts spiritual propaganda to divide the galaxy.

Naboo Royal Cruiser
Also known as the Naboo Diplomatic Cruiser, this ship makes its theatrical appearance in the opening scene of Star Wars Episode II: Attack of the Clones.  The ship is seen being escorted by Naboo N-1 starfighters, carrying Senator Padmé Amidala (Natalie Portman) to Coruscant for an important vote on the Military Creation Act.  After coming to rest on a landing pad, the ship is blown up in an assassination attempt on Senator Amidala's life, though she escapes unharmed.

The ship's design was inspired by the B-2 Spirit stealth bomber.  While the cruiser was entirely CGI, for filming purposes a full-size set of the landing pad was built for the actors with a digital matte painting inserted to create the background.  Pyrotechnics were used in the filming of the scene, though the majority of the explosion was created with CGI by visual effects art director Alex Jaeger.

Background material on the Diplomatic Cruiser state that it was designed in the wake of the Invasion of Naboo to address shortcomings in the previous J-type 327 starship. Still unarmed and covered in shiny chromium plating, it is nevertheless faster and better shielded, with additional back-up drives in case the main Class 0.7 hyperdrive fails. The leading edge of its wing also feature four recharging sockets for N-1 starfighters to dock with the ship.

Naboo Royal Starship

The Naboo Royal Starship features prominently in Star Wars Episode I: The Phantom Menace as the ship that Queen Padmé Amidala (Natalie Portman), Obi-Wan Kenobi (Ewan McGregor) and Qui-Gon Jinn (Liam Neeson) use to escape from the Trade Federation blockade of Naboo. After arriving on Tatooine where they free young Anakin Skywalker (Jake Lloyd), the heroes continue aboard the Royal Starship to Coruscant, before finally using it to return to Naboo and free the planet from the Trade Federation's occupation in a climactic battle. The ship is based on a Lockheed SR-71 Blackbird.

An early design depicted the ship powered by a solar sail; when Lucas called for a sleeker look, designer Doug Chiang drew inspiration from 1950s hood ornaments. According to Chiang, the design of the queen's ship was to exemplify Theedian technology the same way the Space Shuttle exemplified the power of technology in America. A thirty inch, highly detailed model of the ship was built, then sliced into one-inch sections and scanned in order to create a digital model. To reduce the amount of CGI work on the film and get more realistic footage of the ship under natural lighting, a larger ten-foot model was also created for filming scenes of the ship when landed.

According to in-universe material, the Naboo Royal Starship was meant to be a visual representation of the glory of Naboo. A modified J-type 327 Nubian starship, the vessel's unique spaceframe was handcrafted by the Theed Palace Space Vessel Engineering Corp. and its decorative plating of royal chromium – reserved only for Naboo's monarch – was hand-polished and crafted by artisans.  Lacking weaponry, the -long ship featured state-of-the-art deflector shields and a cohort of astromech droids to make emergency repairs. One drawback was that its high-performance T-14 hyperdrive, while easy to acquire on many civilized worlds, could be harder to find on more remote planets.

Naboo Star Skiff
Padmé Amidala travels to Mustafar aboard a Naboo star skiff in Star Wars: Episode III – Revenge of the Sith to confront Anakin Skywalker/Darth Vader (Hayden Christensen) after he turns to the dark side.  Designer Ryan Church sketched the ship to appear "supercharged". Only the ship's boarding ramp was built full scale; some footage was altered from material used in Attack of the Clones. The ship is designed to be reminiscent of the "rocket ships" seen in pulp science-fiction.

Neimoidian Shuttle (Sheathipede-class transport shuttle)
Neimoidian shuttles first appear in The Phantom Menace and are seen throughout the prequel trilogy and Clone Wars television series. Their design is based on a Trade Federation landing ship, turned vertically and altered to be more insectoid and less symmetrical. They are also used by the other Separatist leaders, such as Nuvo Vindi and Wat Tambor. Star Wars lore refers to these vessels as Sheathipede-class transport shuttles built by the insect-like Charrian species, especially popular with the Neimoidians but used by many worlds associated with the Separatist cause.  Intended for short-range diplomatic missions, these -long shuttles feature powerful communication arrays and are unarmed but can be modified for combat.  Some also incorporate an automatic pilot, allowing for a more expansive passenger compartment.

Republic Assault Ship (Acclamator-class assault ship)
Republic assault ships of the Acclamator-class first appear in Attack of the Clones. These ships, originally called "Jedi troop transports ", demonstrate a connection to the original trilogy's Star Destroyers through their triangular hulls. According to Star Wars reference material, these assault ships were built by Rothana Heavy Engineering to serve as the Republic's primary troop transport at the start of the Clone Wars, with a secondary offensive role in space battles.  Their secret construction was initiated by Darth Sidious (Ian McDiarmid) under false orders from the Jedi High Council as part his plan to take control of the galaxy.

With a crew of 700, they can carry up to 16,000 clone troopers and support personnel, along with heavy vehicles including LAAT gunships, AT-TE walkers and SPHA artillery. Unlike many other Star Wars vessels of similar size they can conduct both ground and water landings, allowing them to deploy troops and vehicles directly into battle. Their armament includes 12 quad turbolaser turrets, 24 laser cannons, and 4 heavy strategic missile/torpedo launchers. This weaponry allows them to conduct a range of orbital bombardments, from surgical strikes in support of ground forces to "Base Delta Zero" fleet bombardments which melt the upper crust of a planet's surface.

Republic Attack Cruiser (Venator-class Star Destroyer)

Republic attack cruisers, formally known as Venator-class Star Destroyers, made their first theatrical appearance in the opening space battle of Revenge of the Sith and have appeared throughout the Star Wars franchise. A -long flight deck is built directly into the ship's prow with bow doors, allowing a quick exit for the vessel's complement of 420 starfighters, forty LAAT gunships and twenty-four AT-TEs. After the Republic's victory, these cruisers continued to serve under the Galactic Empire.

Republic Cruiser (Consular-class cruiser)
The Consular-class Republic Cruiser Radiant VII is the first vessel seen in The Phantom Menace. Jedi knights Qui-Gon Jinn (Liam Neeson) and Obi-Wan Kenobi (Ewan McGregor) travel aboard the Radiant VII on their mission to end the Trade Federation's blockade of the planet Naboo. After docking with the Federation's Droid Control Ship, the Radiant VII is destroyed to prevent the Jedi from escaping.

Originally, the Radiant VII was going to be sleek like most Old Republic ships depicted in the Star Wars prequel trilogy. However, Lucas suggested a design similar to the ships in the original trilogy; Doug Chiang and the Lucasfilm art department responded with a design similar to the Tantive IV model created for Star Wars Episode IV: A New Hope. Several antennae were added to focus attention to the cockpit during the opening sequence of The Phantom Menace.  For filming the destruction of the Radiant VII, the crew built a gigantic seven-foot model and rigged it with pyrotechnics, around which was constructed a to-scale hangar.  This use of practical special effects allowed for pieces of the exploding model to interact with the surrounding environment without having to utilize CGI resources.

Consular-class Republic Cruisers like the Radiant VII are "instantly recognizable throughout the galaxy" according to the Star Wars Databank. Built by the Corellian Engineering Corporation, these Republic Cruisers are generally unarmed and feature a red color scheme as a symbol of neutrality and "diplomatic immunity". Underneath the bridge is an interchangeable diplomatic salon pod which can eject from the cruiser in an emergency. During the Clone Wars, many Republic Cruisers underwent the Charger c70 retrofit to become Republic Frigates.

Scimitar (Sith Infiltrator)
Darth Maul pilots a Sith infiltrator, named Scimitar, in The Phantom Menace. Its design includes elements of the TIE interceptor and Lambda-class shuttle. The vehicle has been made into toys by Hasbro and Galoob and models kits by Lego and Ertl. The Scimitar is identified by in-universe sources as a heavily-modified Star Courier manufactured by Republic Sienar Systems, supposedly designed by Raith Sienar himself under orders from Darth Sidious. Beneath the invisibility field generator are storage compartments for probe droids, a speeder bike and other equipment. The Scimitar also incorporates an experimental high-temperature ion engine system which necessitates large radiator panels that fold inward for landings, and is well-armed with six low-profile laser cannons and a proton torpedo launcher.

Star freighter
Padmé Amidala and Anakin Skywalker travel to Naboo aboard a starfreighter in Attack of the Clones. The transport's design is partly based on an ocean liner.

Techno Union Starship (Hardcell-class Interstellar Transport)
Techno Union Starships made their theatrical appearance in Attack of the Clones during the Battle of Geonosis as the Separatist droid army attempts to hold off the clone troopers of the Galactic Republic. Its lack of repulsorlifts gives it limited maneuverability within a planet's atmosphere and the large fuel stores for its rockets are a glaring weakness that can be exploited during the battle. Of the 286 Techno Union starships at the Battle of Geonosis, 169 escape.

Theta-class Shuttle
Emperor Palpatine (Ian McDiarmid) travels aboard a Theta-class shuttle in Revenge of the Sith. The ship was designed to appear like a predecessor to the Lambda-class shuttle. Only the shuttle's boarding ramp was built for filming.

Trade Federation battleship (Lucrehulk-class battleship)
Trade Federation Lucrehulk-class battleships appear in the Prequel trilogy and various other Star Wars media.  Lucas called for these ships to have a "saucer" look with a distinct front and rear, achieved by placing the engines on one side of the ship and the antennae and docking bays on the other.

In The Phantom Menace a fleet of these ships enforces a blockade of the planet Naboo, one of which (identified in background material as the Vuutun Palaa) serves as the Droid Control Ship at the center of the movie's climactic battle.  To capture the Droid Control Ship's destruction, a 1/800 scale model was created and blown up using specially designed pyrotechnic material to simulate a believably massive explosion, and filmed at 340 frames per second to get enough frames for the cut.  A second scale model of the ship's hangar was created and mapped out for the scene where Anakin Skywalker (Jake Lloyd) accidentally flies his starfighter inside the ship.

In-universe, these vessels were originally Lucrehulk-class LH-3210 cargo freighters manufactured by Hoersch-Kessel Drive Inc. that the Trade Federation secretly modified into warships to build up their armed forces.  At  in diameter, each massive battleship can carry an entire army: 6,250 Armored Assault Tanks, 550 Multi-Troop Transports, 1,500 troop carriers, 50 C-9979 Landing Craft, 1,500 Vulture droids and over 329,000 B1 Battle Droids.  The crew is similarly large with 60 supervisors, 3,000 droid crew and 200,000 maintenance droids.  To destroy enemy starfighters trying to attack its transports, each converted battleship is equipped with 42 quad laser emplacements on rotating mounts to hide the ships' military nature.  While helping to conceal the Trade Federations' military build-up, the limited coverage of these weapons leaves significant blind spots vulnerable to attack.  A small number of these battleships were further modified as Droid Control Ships and featured additional communications and computer systems to operate the Trade Federation's droid armies; destroying a Droid Control Ship would disable all droids under its command.

During the Clone Wars, many Lucrehulk-class freighters were more extensively retrofitted to increase their armament over what was carried during the Battle of Naboo.  These Separatist battleships had 185 quad laser batteries, 520 assault laser cannons, and 51 turbolasers.  However, blind spots remained in the armament's coverage which left vulnerable angles that Republic ships could exploit.

Trade Federation Landing Ship (C-9979 Landing Craft)
Trade Federation Landing Ships transport the Trade Federation's invasion forces to Naboo's surface in The Phantom Menace and have appeared in other Star Wars media. Although initial designs were reminiscent of dirigibles, the final design is based on a dragonfly. George Lucas likened the ship's similarity to a biplane. In addition to digital models, an eight-foot-wide scale model of the lander was built to film scenes of these craft landing on Naboo's surface.  Another larger-scale model of the lander's doorway was built to film scenes of Trade Federation vehicles exiting the craft.

Deploying a full load of vehicles is a complex process which can take up to 45 minutes to complete as they exit the vessel via large deployment doors. These doors include perimeter field sensors which detect land mines and other hazards. Powerful tensor field generators bind the removable wings to the vessel while "repulsorlifts" keep them from sagging under their own weight. Manufactured for the Trade Federation by Haor Chall Engineering, the -long craft has a crew of 88 battle droids. In addition to piloting the landing craft and manning its weaponry, these droids also run maintenance and repair shops which service the onboard attack force. Another 361 battle droids can also be carried on board in storage. For self-defense the landing craft is equipped with deflector shields and is armed with two pairs of wingtip laser cannons and four turret-mounted laser cannons.

Spacecraft appearing in the sequel trilogy
Raddus

The Raddus made its theatrical debut as the main cruiser used during the Evacuation of D’Qar in The Force Awakens. The Raddus got its name on request of Admiral Gial Akbar, to honor the fallen Admiral Raddus who died during the battle of Scarif after his ship sustained heavy damage from Imperial bombardment. The Raddus is a MC85 model flagship designed and made in Mon Calamari. The Raddus would later go on to be used by Vice Admiral Amilyn Holdo in a near light speed ramming of the First Order Mega-Destroyer Supremacy.

Spacecraft appearing in other Star Wars media

Ghost (VCX-100 light freighter)
The Ghost is a modified VCX-100 light freighter, manufactured by the Corellian Engineering Corporation, appearing in the Star Wars Rebels television series. Owned and piloted by the gifted Twi'lek, Hera Syndulla (voiced by Vanessa Marshall), it serves as "home base" for a small band of Lothal rebels during the Age of the Empire. Named for its ability to travel past Imperial sensors without detection on numerous missions and skirmishes, the craft included many hidden surprises that aided the crew in their fight against the Empire. Among its many features were a 360-degree dorsal laser cannon turret

The Ghost makes a cameo appearance in Rogue One near the Great Temple of Massassi on Yavin 4. Its captain, Hera Syndulla, is briefly mentioned in the film, and its repair droid, Chopper, makes a brief appearance inside the Temple.

Han Solo pretends to own a spacecraft of the same model in Solo: A Star Wars Story, during the Sabacc game in which he first met Lando Calrissian.

Hammerhead corvette (Sphyrna-class corvette)
The Hammerhead corvette is a ship class that originally appeared in the Star Wars: Knights of the Old Republic video game, and was given a prominent role in Rogue One: A Star Wars Story during the final space battle when one of these ships rammed a disabled Imperial Star Destroyer into another. Its CGI design was purposefully meant to be evocative of the Tantive IV from the original Star Wars film. The in-universe origin for Hammerhead corvettes, formally known as Sphyrna-class corvettes, is that they are an ancient line of ships built by the Corellian Engineering Corporation. They are used by the Rebel Alliance in many different roles: scout ships, tugs, transports, and even battleships.

Rhett Allain, an associate professor of physics at Southeastern Louisiana University, estimated in a 2017 article for Wired that the Hammerhead's engines in Rogue One would have had to generate  (or 200 billion) Newtons of force to push the Star Destroyer: 6,000 times the amount of thrust force generated by a Saturn V rocket.

Imperial Freighter (Gozanti-class cruiser)
The term Imperial Freighter refers to a type of Gozanti-class cruiser, which first appeared as a background vessel in The Phantom Menace and has appeared in other Star Wars media, most notably the Star Wars Rebels television series.  Reference material describes Gozanti-class cruisers as being used by a variety of factions, but those in Imperial service have stronger deflector shields, quicker engines and better weaponry to deter pirates and rebels from stealing their cargo.  In addition to a dorsal twin laser cannon turret and ventral heavy laser cannon turret, these -long ships can carry four TIE fighters via extendable docking clamps.  Gozanti-class Assault Carriers are equipped with magnetic docking clamps that allow them to carry a pair of Walkers for planetary assaults.  Another variant, the IGV-55 Surveillance Vessel, is equipped with multiple listening arrays, modified sensor-dampened engines, and a computer database to store billions of yottabytes of data.

Imperial / Jedi Light Cruiser (Arquitens-class light cruiser)
The Arquitens-class light cruiser is a vessel which first appears in the 2008 Clone Wars television series as well as the Star Wars Rebels television series.  Source material describes it as serving the Galactic Republic during the Clone Wars as a light warship, earning the nickname Jedi Light Cruiser.  After the Republic's victory it continued to serve the Galactic Empire in the same capacity, though under the name Imperial Light Cruiser.  Armed with four double-barrel turbolaser batteries and four quad laser turrets, Arquitens-class ships can absorb a surprising amount of damage thanks to their armored hulls and layers of energy shielding.

Outrider (YT-2400 freighter)
Within Star Wars Legends, the Outrider is Dash Rendar's CEC YT-2400 class freighter in the Shadows of the Empire multimedia campaign. It is a playable ship in the Shadows of the Empire video game, and Kenner released an Outrider toy. While Steve Perry outlined the ship's story and role, Doug Chiang designed the ship itself.

The Outrider was digitally inserted into the Special Edition of A New Hope.  A YT-2400 light freighter also appeared within the Star Wars Rebels Season 3 episode Iron Squadron. It was piloted by Mart Mattin, who was a nephew of Rebel Commander, Jun Sato. It is unknown if the ship is meant to be same as the one in A New Hope. According to Gary Whitta, who served as writer of Rogue One, Dash Rendar is a controversial character among Lucasfilm Story Group, which decreases the chances of the character becoming part of canon.

Profundity (Mon Calamari cruiser)

The Profundity first appears in Rogue One: A Star Wars Story, leading the Rebel fleet's attack on Scarif under Admiral Raddus. It is identified in Star Wars sources as a modified MC75 star cruiser, a class of Mon Calamari buildings and exploration ships which have been repurposed for war. The Profundity itself was the former Civic Governance tower of the city of Nystullum during the Mon Calamari's exodus from their homeworld.

Razor Crest
The Razor Crest was a pre-Imperial patrol gunship owned and piloted by the Mandalorian bounty hunter Din Djarin in the Disney+ web-series The Mandalorian.

Stinger Mantis
The Stinger Mantis, more commonly known as the Mantis, was an S-161 "Stinger" XL luxury yacht piloted by Greez Dritus in Star Wars Jedi: Fallen Order.

The Malevolence
The Malevolence was a Subjugator-class heavy cruiser that served as the flagship of the Confederacy of Independent Systems, as well as General Grievous's ship until it was destroyed by Anakin Skywalker when he sabotaged the navigation systems and caused it to slam into a moon. It has two ion cannons that can knock out the power from ships, before destroying it with its turbolasers. The warship appeared in Season One of Star Wars: The Clone Wars.

Spacecraft appearing in Star Wars Legends
A number of named vessels appear only in Star Wars Legends sources, material which was branded non-canon after The Walt Disney Company acquired Lucasfilm.  The Ebon Hawk is Darth Revan's ship in Star Wars: The Old Republic: Revan, Star Wars: Knights of the Old Republic, and Star Wars: Knights of the Old Republic II: The Sith Lords.  It is designed to be reminiscent of the Millennium Falcon.  The Moldy Crow is a modified Corellian HWK-290 used by Kyle Katarn and Jan Ors in the Star Wars: Dark Forces and Star Wars: Dark Forces II: Jedi Knight video games. After it is destroyed in Star Wars Jedi Knight II: Jedi Outcast, it is replaced with the Raven's Claw.  The Rogue Shadow is the ship used by Starkiller and Juno Eclipse in Star Wars: The Force Unleashed.  The Virago is Xizor's ship in Shadows of the Empire. Its clamshell design, styled after a stealth fighter, is inspired by pulley castings. The Wild Karrde is medium-sized freight vessel used by smuggler Talon Karrde in Timothy Zahn's Heir to the Empire novels.

See also

List of Star Wars starfighters
Walker (Star Wars)
Star Wars planetary vehicles

Bibliography

Notes

References

External links

 Index to Star Wars starships at starwars.com
 A visual guide to major Star Wars starships at https://screenrant.com

 Intricate Illustrations of Star Wars Spacecraft Cutouts Reveal Their Inner Mechanics by Leah Pellegrini April 23, 2016

Star Wars lists
Star Wars